James Wandesford Butler, 1st Marquess of Ormonde,  (15 July 1774 – 18 May 1838) was an Irish nobleman and politician. He was the second son of John Butler, 17th Earl of Ormonde and Frances Susan Elizabeth Wandesford. He was born at Kilkenny castle on 15 July 1774.

Butler was a Member of Parliament (MP) for Kilkenny City in the Irish House of Commons in 1796 (he never took his seat and resigned after 3 months) and served then for Kilkenny County until the Act of Union in 1801. He sat subsequently for the Irish county constituency of County Kilkenny and was member of the UK House of Commons from 1801, until he succeeded to the peerage, as 19th Earl of Ormonde, in 1820, on the death of his elder brother, Walter, the 18th Earl and 1st Marquess of Ormonde in the Irish peerage (the latter title becoming extinct upon his death). He was a well-known advocate for the Irish people with his first speech at Westminster condemning the Irish Window tax and defending the right of Irish landowners.

Following his brother’s death, James inherited some £450,000 in debts. As a result, The Ormonde Estates in Derbyshire were sold at auction on Thursday 27 November 1824. The Sutton Hall Estate, including the Manor House, some 5,500 acres of land (which included coal mines), generated some £5,800 in rents alone, and was sold for £216,000 to the Manchester Spinner John Arkwright Esq. The Chilcote Estate, comprising of 1,320 acres generating £2,200 annually, was sold to a Mr Robinson of Kingston, Surrey, for £87,000. The adjacent Cottage Park Farm, comprising 281 acres, was sold to a solicitor, Mr Cookney of Holborn (acting on behalf the brewer H. Worthington Esq). The sales generated £450,000.

Having joined the fashionable society in London, he became a companion of the Prince Regent. Subsequently, at the Prince's coronation as George IV, he was created a Peer of the United Kingdom, as Baron Ormonde, of Llanthony, in the county of Monmouth and in 1825, Marquess of Ormonde.

Marriage and children
He married Grace Louisa Staples, daughter of Rt. Hon. John Staples and Hon. Henrietta Molesworth (daughter of Richard Molesworth, 3rd Viscount Molesworth), on 12 October 1807. They had five sons and five daughters:

 John Butler, 2nd Marquess of Ormonde (1808–1854), who married Frances Jane (d. 26 Aug. 1903), daughter of Gen. Hon. Sir Edward Paget, GCB
 Lord Walter Wandesford Butler (1814–1861), Army officer
 Captain Lord James Wandesford Butler (1815–1893), who married Lady Rachel Evelyn Russell, daughter of the 6th Duke of Bedford
Louisa Grace Butler (1816–1896), married Thomas Fortescue, 1st Baron Clermont
 Lord Richard Molesworth Butler (1818–1838)
 Lieut Lord Charles Wandesford Butler (1820–1857)
 Lady Harriet Eleanor Butler (died 28 Sept 1885), married Robert Fowler, 1st son of Rt Rev Robert Fowler DD, Bishop of Ossory, Ferns and Leighlin
 Anne Butler (died 1849), married John Wynne, of Hazlewood House, Sligo
 Lady Elizabeth Butler (died 1892)
 Lady Mary Charlotte Butler (died 1840)

In 1827, the London residence of Lord and Lady Ormonde was recorded as being 14 Weymouth Street, Westminster.

Elevation to Marquessate

Lord Ormonde's grandson, James Butler, 3rd Marquess of Ormonde is recorded as having written to the then Prime Minister of the United Kingdom, Benjamin Disraeli, regarding the restoration of the Dukedom of Ormonde in October 1868. Ormonde claimed that his grandfather, the 19th Earl of Ormond, had been advised by Lord Liverpool to apply for the restoration of the Dukedom, and that Lord Liverpool had advised him that in order to achieve this, he would first need to apply to be elevated from the rank of Earl to Marquess. An application was duly made, and James, 19th Earl of Ormond was granted the title Marquess of Ormonde in 1825. The 3rd Marquess believed that Lord Liverpool's loss of the Office of Prime Minister in 1827 frustrated this plan, and the 1st Marquess took no further action towards applying for the restoration of the Dukedom.

See also
 Butler dynasty

References

 Parliamentary Election Results in Ireland, 1801-1922, edited by B. M. Walker (Royal Irish Academy 1978)

1774 births
1838 deaths
James
Irish MPs 1790–1797
Irish MPs 1798–1800
Knights of St Patrick
Lord-Lieutenants of Kilkenny
Butler, James Wandesford
Butler, James Wandesford
Butler, James Wandesford
Butler, James Wandesford
Butler, James Wandesford
Butler, James Wandesford
Butler, James Wandesford
Butler, James Wandesford
Butler, James Wandesford
UK MPs who inherited peerages
UK MPs who were granted peerages
Whig (British political party) MPs for Irish constituencies
James 1
Peers of the United Kingdom created by George IV